The 1978 Bucknell Bison football team was an American football team that represented Bucknell University as an independent during the 1978 NCAA Division I-AA football season.

In their fourth year under head coach Bob Curtis, the Bison compiled a 5–5 record. John Cieslewicz, Mike Cosimano and Brian Shaffer were the team captains.

This was the first year of competition for Division I-AA, later to be renamed the Football Championship Subdivision. Bucknell, along with its in-state rivals Lafayette and Lehigh, moved up to I-AA after having previously competed as independents in NCAA Division II. The Bison's 1978 schedule included opponents from Division I-A, Division I-AA, Division II and Division III.

Bucknell played its home games at Memorial Stadium on the university campus in Lewisburg, Pennsylvania.

Schedule

References

Bucknell
Bucknell Bison football seasons
Bucknell Bison football